Sub-Doppler cooling is a class of laser cooling techniques that reduce the temperature of atoms and molecules below the Doppler cooling limit. Doppler cooling processes have a cooling limit that is characterized by the momentum recoil from the emission of a photon from the particle.

Some methods of sub-Doppler cooling include optical molasses, Sisyphus cooling, evaporative cooling, free space Raman cooling, Raman side-band cooling, resolved sideband cooling, polarization gradient cooling, and the use of a dark magneto-optical trap.

Some possible motivations for sub-doppler cooling include cooling to the motional ground state, a requirement for maintaining fidelity during many quantum computation operations.

Dark magneto-optical trap 
A magneto-optical trap (MOT) is commonly used for cooling and trapping a substance by Doppler cooling. In the process of Doppler cooling, the red detuned light would be absorbed by atoms from one certain direction and re-emitted in a random direction. The electrons of the atoms would decay to an alternative ground states if the atoms have more than one hyperfine ground level. There is the case of all the atoms in the other ground states rather than the ground states of Doppler cooling, then system cannot cool the atoms further. 

In order to solve this problem, the other re-pumping light would be incident on the system to repopulate the atoms to restart the Doppler cooling process. This would induce higher amounts of fluorescence being emitted from the atoms which can be absorbed by other atoms, acting as a repulsive force. Due to this problem, the Doppler limit would increase and is easy to meet. When there is a dark spot or lines on the shape of the re-pumping light, the atoms in the middle of the atomic gas would not be excited by the re-pumping light which can decrease the repulsion force from the previous cases. 

This can help to cool the atoms to a lower temperature than the typical Doppler cooling limit. This is called a dark magneto-optical trap (DMOT).

References

Atomic, molecular, and optical physics